A head of college or head of house is the head or senior member of a college within a collegiate university. The title used varies between colleges, including dean, master, president, principal, provost, rector and warden.

The role of the head of college varies significantly between colleges of the same university, and even more so between different universities.  However, the head of college will often have responsibility for leading the governing body of the college, often acting as a chair of various college committees; for executing the decisions of the governing body through the college's organisational structure, acting as a chief executive; and for representing the college externally, both within the government of the university and further afield often in aid of fund-raising for the college.  The nature of the role varies in importance depending on the nature of the central university. At a loosely federated university such as the University of London or the National University of Ireland, where each member institution is self-governing and some hold university status in their own right, the head of each institution has the same level of responsibility as the vice-chancellor of a university.  At more centralised universities, the heads of colleges have less power and responsibility.

University governance 

Heads of colleges will often participate in the governance of the central university. Mechanisms for this very between university and include:

 The Collegiate Council at the University of London, which advises the Board of Trustees and is responsible for academic affairs.
 The Conference of Colleges at the University of Oxford, the chair of which and one other member sit on the university council.
 Four places on the university council at the University of Cambridge reserved for heads of colleges.
 Ex officio membership of the senate for all heads of colleges at Durham University, Lancaster University and the University of Roehampton.
 The Partnership Council at the University of the Highlands and Islands.
 Joint appointments of heads of colleges as pro vice-chancellors and members of the university executive board at University of the Arts London.

Terminology 

Many different titles are used for heads of colleges. These have also changed with time, in particularly the recent move away from using master by colleges at Durham, Kent (where the position of head of college was abolished), Rice and Yale universities.

In the case of some older colleges whose statutes are in Latin, the titles used in the modern era are English translations of those found in the statutes, e.g. "provost" for praepositus, and "warden" for custos.

See also 

 Dean
 President
 Principal
 Provost
 Rector
 Warden

References 

Terminology of the University of Cambridge
Terminology of the University of Oxford
Academic administrators